Toy Gun Films is a production company that is in the process of developing a diverse slate of art house films. The company believes that just like a toy gun is a weapon of imagination, film is a weapon of imagination that has the power to transform hearts and minds. The company was founded by Brent Ryan Green and Jeff Goldberg in 2009.

List of films released by Toy Gun Films

References

External links 
Official Website
IMDB Site

Film production companies of the United States